Antonina Egina was a cinematographer who worked in the Soviet Union at Mosfilm during the 1950s and 1960s. She was one of the few women working in this role.

Selected filmography 

 Serdtse Rossii (1970)
 Papina zhena (1968)
 My, russkiy narod (1966)
 Polovodye (1963)
 Duel (1961)
 Pervoye svidaniye (1960)
 Soldatskoye serdtse (1959)
 Gost s Kubani (1956)
 Saltanat (1955)
 Yegor Bulychyov i drugiye (1953)

References 

Soviet cinematographers
Russian women cinematographers
1910 births
1978 deaths